Budongquan railway station  is a station on the Chinese Qingzang Railway. Located on the southern slopes of the Kunlun Mountains in the Yushu Tibetan Autonomous Prefecture it serves a small community of the same name. The area is near the border of the prefecture's Zhidoi and Zadoi Counties, but very remote from the main populated areas of either of them.

Station layout

See also

 Qingzang Railway
 List of stations on Qingzang railway

References

Railway stations in Qinghai
Stations on the Qinghai–Tibet Railway